Syed Sabir Pasha (born 5 November 1972) is a former Indian football player and most recently was the  interim coach of the Chennaiyin. During his playing days, Pasha played for Indian Bank in the National Football League from 1991 to 2007 and represented India between 1993 and 2001.

Playing career
Born in Tamil Nadu, Pasha started his career with Indian Bank in 1991. With Indian Bank, he won several titles including 2001–02 I-League Second Division, Chennai Super League, Tamil Nadu State League. He also won Lal Bahadur Shastri Cup in 1998 and finished runners-up in 1996 Scissors Cup.

Pasha later represented Tamil Nadu in competitions such as the Santosh Trophy where he was top scorer in the entire competition during the 1996 and 1999 seasons. Pasha never played football at a semi-professional level in the hotbeds of Indian football of Kolkata and Goa at the time. East Bengal, at one time, did attempt to sign Pasha but Pasha rejected in order to stay with Indian Bank.

On 23 January 2007, it was announced that Pasha had retired from playing football.

International career
Pasha first began representing India at the international level in 1993. His most notable moment when playing for the national team was in 1995 when he scored the winning goal against Bangladesh in the 1995 South Asian Games final to win India the gold medal.

It was always wondered if whether Pasha representing a team in Tamil Nadu was going against him or not in terms of his standing with the national team. Despite his good performances with the national team whenever he played, Pasha only played a full-game with the national team on a couple of occasions.

Coaching career

Indian Bank and Tamil Nadu
After retiring from playing football, Pasha went on to become the coach of Indian Bank. In 2010, Pasha received his AFC "A" License after completing the course in Japan. In 2012, he was appointed as the head coach of the Tamil Nadu football team for the Santosh Trophy. In his very first season as head coach, Pasha bought Tamil Nadu to the final of the 2012 Santosh Trophy but could not help his side win as they fell to Services 2–3.

AIFF Elite Academy
Before the 2014–15 I-League U19 season, Pasha was confirmed as the head coach of the AIFF Elite Academy.

Chennaiyin
On 17 February 2016, it was announced that Pasha had signed with Chennaiyin FC as their assistant coach and head of grassroots development.

Honours

India
SAFF Championship: 1999; runner-up: 1995
 South Asian Games Gold medal: 1995; Bronze medal: 1999

References

External links
 AIFF Profile.

1972 births
Living people
Footballers from Chennai
Association football forwards
Indian footballers
Indian football managers
Indian football coaches
India international footballers
Indian Muslims
South Asian Games medalists in football
South Asian Games gold medalists for India
South Asian Games bronze medalists for India
Footballers at the 1998 Asian Games
Asian Games competitors for India
Chennaiyin FC managers